The Mercedes  was a radical early car model designed in 1901 by Wilhelm Maybach and Paul Daimler, for Emil Jellinek. Produced in Stuttgart, Germany, by Daimler-Motoren-Gesellschaft (DMG), it began the Mercedes line of cars (since 1926 re-branded Mercedes-Benz).

A significant advancement over the previous generation of automobiles, which were modified stagecoaches, the Mercedes  is regarded as the first modern car. It was equipped with a powerful petrol engine, it was both wider and larger with a tailored steel chassis, and its center of mass was near the ground. Originally designed as a racing car, the Mercedes  was further developed for normal road use.

Historical background
In the 19th century, Wilhelm Maybach's career as an industrial designer had been with Gottlieb Daimler in their Cannstatt workshop (near Stuttgart), at which together they had pioneered the petrol engine production and were responsible for designing and making some of the world's first automobiles. By 1900, Maybach was the Chief Engineer within the Daimler Motoren Gesellschaft (DMG), which had been an expansion of their previous company that originated from their small workshop. He never got along with the new capitalist board, and later left to join Ferdinand von Zeppelin. In 1900, Gottlieb Daimler died and his son Paul Daimler had taken his place beside Maybach.

Origin of the name "Mercedes"
Emil Jellinek was a wealthy Austrian businessman and Austro-Hungarian diplomat living in Nice on the French Riviera. His daughter Adriana Manuela Ramona Jellinek, 10 years old at the car's construction, was given the pet name "Mercédès". Jellinek used to name his possessions after her, such as his mansions, the automobiles he sold, his racing car team, etc.. He himself was often known as Monsieur Mercedes.

As an avid fan of the DMG brand, Jellinek had signed up two DMG-Phoenix cars for competing in the Nice-La Turbie race on 30 March 1900, introducing the Mercedes name for both his racing team and its cars. A tragedy ensued when Wilhelm Bauer, the chief mechanic of DMG, raced one of the cars and was killed after the first curve of the race. Consequently, DMG canceled all further involvement in motorsport.

Nonetheless, Jellinek persuaded DMG to design a new model for competing again. He insisted that the powerful engine should be developed by both Maybach and Paul Daimler and be named Daimler-Mercedes, after his daughter. This wish was granted because the Daimler brand of the DMG had been already conceded to the French Panhard carmaker for all France.

Development
Jellinek specified revolutionary improvements. Unlike the previous generation of cars, unstable motorized coaches of narrow high bodies which were so prone to overturn, the novel Mercedes should be longer, wider, and of a lower center of gravity.

Over the following months of 1900 Jellinek oversaw the process closely, at first through daily telegrams, and subsequently, by traveling personally. Maybach tested the new car for the first time on 22 November and Jellinek received his first delivery on 22 December 1900.

In January 1901, Emil Jellinek's Mercedes team tested six of the new Mercedes  in the Pau Grand Prix, but the racecar was of a disappointing performance by multiple technical complications and enduring just for few laps. However, in the Nice-La Turbie event of March 1901, it was much different. Jellinek participated through five Mercedes  and the German driver Wilhelm Werner. The cars dominated the race from start to finish with a record average speed of  ), beating the previous  ) and reaching top speeds of  ). Those results easily outclassed all other competing cars in any capacity. The automotive world was so astonished that Paul Meyan, director of the French Automobile Club, stated: "We have entered the Mercedes era". Eventually, the road car achieved typical speeds of  ). The racing version could exceed  .

In Stuttgart, DMG mounted two additional back seats on the Mercedes , transforming it for a family car. The Mercedes was so successful that the production lines of the DMG ran at full capacity. The Mercedes trademark was used on DMG production automobiles from 23 June 1902. It was formally registered on 26 September 1902.

In June 1903, Emil Jellinek changed his own name to Jellinek-Mercedes, stating: "This is probably the first time that a father has taken his daughter's name".

Technical description

Dimensions

Running gear

There were two braking systems, one hand operated and the other by foot. The main brake was the hand brake which acted on the rear wheels which had  drums. The secondary, foot brake, acted on the chain drive's intermediate shaft and was water-cooled.

Both axles were rigid, equipped with semi-elliptic springs. The steering-axles were designed to minimise transmission of road shocks to the driver. The steering column was inclined backwards unlike the vertical shaft on many of its contemporaries.

The engine of the Mercedes  was at the front of the car driving the rear wheels through a large roller chain. The gearshift was at the driver's right side, featuring a gate change system with four forward speeds and a reverse gear. The drum like compact clutch system was attached to the flywheel. The flywheel consisted of a self-adjustable coil spring made up of wound spring steel. The tension at which the clutch operated was regulated by a conical cam.

Engine
The main bearings were made of magnalium, an aluminium alloy with 5% magnesium. The crankcase was also made of aluminium. The intake and exhaust valves were no longer opened by cylinder pressure but by two camshafts on the sides of the engine, driven by gears from the flywheel. There were two carburetors, one for each cylinder-pair.

The engine was started by a hand crank aided by the presence of a decompressor. The engine also incorporated a low-voltage magneto with make-and-break spark ignition. This was fitted at Jellinek's demand, replacing the antiquated hot tube system.

Cooling was provided by a pumped water system. Maybach's tubular radiator, patented in 1897, known as a honeycomb radiator, was similar to  ones. Its rectangular grille had  pipes with a square cross section of  ×  to improve airflow, and held  of water. The airflow was assisted by a fan located behind the radiator.

See also
Daimler Motoren Gesellschaft
Emil Jellinek
Timeline of most powerful production cars
Mercedes Simplex
List of Mercedes-Benz vehicles

Notes

References

 
 Mercedes 35 HP, at seriouswheels.com.

External links
Mercedes Benz enterprise
Jellinek's biography
History of Mercedes Benz RUS

Daimler Motoren Gesellschaft
35hp
Cars introduced in 1901
Veteran vehicles
1900s cars